Laerte-se is a 2017 Brazilian documentary film directed by Lygia Barbosa and Eliane Brum about the Brazilian cartoonist Laerte Coutinho, who at the age of 58 came out as a crossdresser and later as a transgender woman.

Premise
Laerte-se examines gender identity and what it means to be masculine/feminine, while also exploring the issues Learte is facing by introducing herself as a woman and her talents as an artist.

Cast
 Laerte Coutinho
 Eliane Brum
 Rita Lee

Release
The film was released by Netflix on May 1, 2017.

References

External links
 
 
 

2017 documentary films
2017 films
Transgender-related documentary films
Brazilian documentary films
Brazilian LGBT-related films
2010s Portuguese-language films
Portuguese-language Netflix original films
2017 LGBT-related films
Films about trans women
Biographical films about LGBT people